Lucy Ameh  (born 12 June 1980) is a Nollywood actress and business woman who became popular after starring in Braids on a Bald Head in 2010.

Early life and education 
Lucy was born in Kaduna on 12 June 1980. She started acting right from tender age at her church. She finished from NTA TV college and had her B.Sc in Mass Communication from Ahmadu Bello University, Zaria after which she obtained diploma in Law at the University of Jos.

Career 
Lucy started acting right from a young age, acting in several church plays and became recognized as an actress after acting in the movie 'Queen of Zazzau'.

Filmography 
Women and Lie
Handcuff
Bariga sugar
Learning curves
Just friends
Satisfy
Revolution
Amina
Unfair
O-town
Braids on a bald head

Award 
Best actress award at the Kannywood entertainment in 2014 for the Queen of Zazzau.

See also 

 Hadiza Aliyu
 Amina (2021 film)
 Maureen Ihua

References

External links 
 Lucy Ameh IMDB

Living people
Nigerian film actresses
Nigerian film award winners
Nigerian businesspeople
1980 births
21st-century Nigerian actresses
Nigerian women in business
Ahmadu Bello University alumni
Kannywood actors
University of Jos alumni
Nigerian television actresses
20th-century births